Afrasura submarmorata is a moth of the subfamily Arctiinae first described by Sergius G. Kiriakoff in 1958. It is found in Uganda.

References

Endemic fauna of Uganda
Moths described in 1958
submarmorata
Insects of Uganda
Moths of Africa